Smoke & Strong Whiskey is an album by Irish folk singer Christy Moore, released in 1991.

Track listing
All tracks composed by Christy Moore; except where indicated
 "Welcome to the Cabaret" – 3:50
 "Fairytale of New York" (Shane MacGowan, Jem Finer) – 3:55
 "Scapegoats" (E. Cowan, Moore) – 2:45
 "Aisling" (Shane MacGowan, Moore) – 3:20
 "Burning Times" (Charlie M. Murphy) – 5:55
 "Smoke & Strong Whiskey" (Wally Page, Tony Boylan, Moore) – 5:18
 "Whacker Humphries" – 3:30
 "Blackjack County Chain" (Red Lane) – 2:45
 "Green Island" (Ewan MacColl) – 3:55
 "Encore" – 3:50

Personnel
 Christy Moore – vocal, backing vocals, harmonies, guitar, Bodhran
 Eoghan O'Neill – bass, acoustic guitar, backing vocals
 Noel Bridgeman – drums, percussion, backing vocals
 Declan Sinnott – electric guitar
 Roger Askew – organ, piano
 Jimmy Faulkner – guitar
 Pat Crowley – accordion
 Des Moore – acoustic and electric guitar
 Keith Donald – saxophone
 Davy Spillane – flute
 Eamon Cambell – acoustic guitar, banjo
 Carol Nelson – keyboards
 Sharon Shannon – accordion
 Carl Geraghty – saxophone
 Steve McDonagh – horn
 Avert Abbing – piano, keyboards
 Mattie Fox – backing vocals

1991 albums
Christy Moore albums